Mumbai-Pune-Mumbai  is an Indian Marathi language romantic drama film released on 11 June 2010. Produced by Mirah Entertainment Pvt Ltd and distributed by Twinkle Group. Directed and co-written by Satish Rajwade with a screenplay by Rajwade and Parag Kulkarni. It had only 2 characters unnamed in the movie played by Swapnil Joshi and Mukta Barve. The movie is based on a love story between a boy and girl from different cities of Pune and Mumbai respectively and how their competitive spirits get them together. The film was critically and commercially successful at the box office. A Sequel, Mumbai-Pune-Mumbai 2 was released on 12 November 2015.

It was remade in Hindi in 2014 as Mumbai Delhi Mumbai, in Kannada as Pyarge Aagbittaite, in Telugu as Made in Vizag  and in Punjabi as Chandigarh Amritsar Chandigarh. In Gujarati, it is remade as "Taari Saathe".

Plot 

The story revolves around two young characters: a boy named Gautam Pradhan (Swapnil Joshi) from Pune and a girl named Gauri Deshpande (Mukta Barve) from Mumbai. The film begins with Gauri arriving in Pune in order to meet a prospective groom who is mentioned as "Hridaymardyam" after the name of his residential colony. Gautam is busy playing cricket with his friends and she inadvertently comes across him to ask him for Hridaymardyam's address. With the help of the directions given by Gautam, Gauri reaches Hridaymardyam's house only to find the door locked. She checks out the neighbouring houses to learn about his whereabouts but leaves as all the neighbours behave rudely with her. Feeling helpless, she walks into a local shop and calls up her sister in Mumbai via public telephone as her mobile has run out of battery. Gautam coincidentally reaches the same shop along with his friend to buy a ball and bumps into Gauri. She asks him the directions of the nearest coffee shop in the city but he offers to drop her off over there from his scooter. Being in a new town, she agrees to his request only to save the hassle of searching for an address again and even the concern of missing it. Gautam asks her to keep his mobile in her handbag. They go to a coffee shop where Gauri reveals to Gautam that her mother arranged Hridaymardyam as a groom for her against her wishes and that she refuses to marry him as he is from "Pune". The two end up having coffee and Gauri pays Gautam's bill as he has no money. He repays her by withdrawing money from an ATM via his credit card. After that, Gauri decides to spend the whole day in Pune and tells Gautam that she will now meet Hridaymardyam in her own leisure. He accompanies her to Sarasbaug and Tulshibaug where the two constantly debate over their respective hometowns and try to boast about their own cities. Later, Gauri calls up her mother from a public telephone in a shop and learns Hridaymardyam's mobile number from her. She subsequently visits the Sinhagad Fort along with Gautam where the two share their major life experiences and small secrets to each other (such as Gautam telling about his Japanese ex-girlfriend and Gauri telling about her ex-boyfriend in Mumbai). While leaving from Sinhagad, Gauri tries to call up Hridaymardyam from Gautam's mobile but finds it engaged. Thinking nothing of it, she visits the Dagadusheth Ganapati with Gautam and they end the day-out with having coffee together in a restaurant. Meanwhile, throughout the film, Gautam mysteriously never leaves her company and neither does Gauri despite many scenarios where they have gone their separate ways. They have a curious chemistry where it seems that they have fallen in love. When the time comes for Gauri's departure for Mumbai, Gautam drops her off at the Pune Junction Railway Station where she hands over a written letter to him and asks him to deliver it to Hridaymardyam, as it explains the reasons of not being able to marry him. She also returns Gautam's mobile to him when they finally ask for each other's names for the first time. As Gautam reveals his name to be "Pune", Gauri befittingly identifies herself just as "Mumbai". When asked for mobile number, Gautam mystically replies "असंही आपण पुन्हा भेटणार नाही! त्यापेक्षा, आजचा दिवस ठेव की आठवणीत!" ("We will anyway never meet again! Instead, keep this day in your memories!") and refuses to give it. As he leaves from the railway station, Gauri receives a phone-call from Hridaymardyam whose identity is not yet revealed. He asks her to meet him outside the station and she agrees as there are 15 minutes pending for her train's arrival. She walks outside the station to find Gautam unable to start his scooter and no sign of Hridaymardyam yet. He expresses surprise and teases her over her eagerness to meet Hridaymardyam, declaring that she has surely decided to marry him which makes her blush. As Hridaymardyam does not show up, Gauri asks for Gautam's mobile to call him up. He asks her to check the dial list, the second entry below her number. She dials it but finds the number engaged and decides to leave, already having the letter left in Gautam's possession. However, she stops and asks him how he got her number which she never gave to him, to which, he replies "ते फारसं महत्त्वाचं नाहीये! तु हा विचार कर की त्याच नंबरवरून तोच नंबर कसा काय लागेल?" ("That is not important! What you should think is how can a number get dialed from the same number?") Gauri ignores this and begins to leave but Gautam stops her and says "तु लावलास! एकदा नाही दोनदा! ह्याच फोनवरून हाच नंबर!" ("You dialed it! Not once but twice! This same number from this number"), revealing that he, himself, is in fact, "Hridaymardyam", the one whom she had originally met and had unknowingly ended up spending the day with. As she digests this new information, he explains how she approached him that morning and that he thought of trying out this new way of dating a girl. He proposes to her but she says she will think about it (her blushes clearly indicate it is a "yes") and runs away to the platform. The film ends with Gauri trying to catch the moving train with Gautam chasing her and the credits roll.

Cast 

 Swapnil Joshi as Gautam Pradhan from Pune
 Mukta Barve as Gauri Deshpande from Mumbai
 Mohit Gokhale as Chhotya (Gautam's friend)

Production
The shooting of the film is done at various locations in Pune and around. Popular tourist attractions like Tulshi Baug, Mahathma Phule Mandai, Saras Baug, Sinhagad Fort, Dagadusheth Halwai Ganapati Temple, Pune Railway Station  and various streets like Z Bridge, JM road, City Pride kothrud, Necklace road Pashan, in Pune are seen in the film.

Soundtrack

The lyrics for the film were penned by Shrirang Godbole, with music composed by Avinash-Vishwajeet

Sequels

A sequel of the movie Mumbai-Pune-Mumbai 2 was released on 12 November 2015. The Third installment of the movie Mumbai-Pune-Mumbai 3 was released on 7 December 2018. It has Swwapnil Joshi and Mukta Barve in the lead roles.

Remakes
It was remade in Hindi in 2014 as Mumbai Delhi Mumbai, in Kannada as Pyarge Aagbittaite, in Telugu as Made in Vizag  and in Punjabi as Chandigarh Amritsar Chandigarh. In Gujarati, it is remade as "Taari Saathe".

See also
 Mumbai-Pune-Mumbai 2
 Avinash–Vishwajeet

References

External links
 

2010 films
Marathi films remade in other languages
Indian romantic comedy films
Films directed by Satish Rajwade
2010s Marathi-language films
2010 romantic comedy films